Abi Mnigel Mosque  is a small mosque in the north of the Medina of Tunis, near the Bab Souika suburb.

Localization
It is located in 16 El Nfefta Street.

Etymology
According to the historian Mohamed Belkhodja, the mosque's name has two possible origins: A not well-known saint called Abi Mnigel, or the Abi Mnigel Bird (Tayr Al Ababil), a sacred bird mentioned in the coran.

History
According to the commemorative plaque at the entrance, it was built in the 13th century.
it's known for its minbar that was made in 1493  and where the chahada is engraved.
The mosque was restored between 1963 and 1966.

References 

Mosques in Tunis
11th-century mosques